Nicola Girasoli (21 July 1957) is a prelate of the Roman Catholic Church who is  Apostolic Nuncio to Slovakia since July 2022. He served as nuncio to Zambia and Malawi from 2006 until 2011 and nuncio to the Antilles and several other Caribbean nations from 2011 to 2017. From 2017 to 2022 he served as nuncio to Peru. He has been an archbishop since 2006.

Life 
Born in Ruvo di Puglia, Girasoli was ordained to the priesthood on 15 June 1980 by Pope John Paul II. He earned a doctorate in canon law. To prepare for a diplomatic career he entered the Pontifical Ecclesiastical Academy in 1981. He joined the diplomatic service of the Holy See on 1 May 1985. His assignments included postings in Indonesia, Australia, Hungary, Belgium, the United States, and Argentina, as well as work in the Section for General Affairs of the Vatican Secretariat of State.

On 24 January 2006, Pope Benedict XVI appointed him nuncio to Zambia and Malawi, and titular archbishop of Egnazia Appula. He received his episcopal consecration on 11 March from Cardinal Angelo Sodano, with Archbishop Robert Sarah, and Bishop Luigi Martella as co-consecrators.

On 29 October 2011, he was appointed apostolic delegate to the Antilles, and nuncio to Antigua and Barbuda, Bahamas, Dominica, Jamaica, Grenada, Saint Kitts and Nevis, Saint Lucia, Saint Vincent and the Grenadines, Suriname and Guyana. On 21 December 2011, he also became nuncio to Trinidad and Tobago and Barbados.

On 16 June 2017, Pope Francis named him nuncio to Peru. In May 2018, he was mentioned as a possible candidate to fill the position of Substitute for General Affairs in the Secretariat of State because he was thought to be "very close to Pope Francis and agreeable to Cardinal Pietro Parolin", the Secretary of State.

On 2 July 2022, Pope Francis named him nuncio to Slovakia.

In addition to Italian, he speaks English, French, and Spanish. He devoted several years to studying the rights of minorities and has written on the subject.

Writings

See also
 List of heads of the diplomatic missions of the Holy See

References

External links 

 
 Catholic Hierarchy: Archbishop Nicolas Girasoli 

1957 births
21st-century Italian Roman Catholic titular archbishops
Living people
Pontifical Ecclesiastical Academy alumni
Apostolic Nuncios to Zambia
Apostolic Nuncios to Malawi
Apostolic Nuncios to Peru
Apostolic Nuncios to Barbados
Apostolic Nuncios to Antigua and Barbuda
Apostolic Nuncios to the Bahamas
Apostolic Nuncios to Dominica
Apostolic Nuncios to Jamaica
Apostolic Nuncios to Grenada
Apostolic Nuncios to Guyana
Apostolic Nuncios to Saint Kitts and Nevis
Apostolic Nuncios to Saint Lucia
Apostolic Nuncios to Suriname
Apostolic Nuncios to Saint Vincent and the Grenadines
Apostolic Nuncios to Trinidad and Tobago